Catalebeda is a genus of moths in the family Lasiocampidae. The genus was identified by Per Olof Christopher Aurivillius in 1902.

Selected species
Catalebeda bimaculata Strand, 1913
Catalebeda cuneilinea Walker, 1856
Catalebeda discocellularis Strand, 1912
Catalebeda elegans Aurivillius
Catalebeda intermedia Aurivillius, 1925
Catalebeda jamesoni Bethune-Baker, 1908
Catalebeda meridionalis
Catalebeda producta Walker, 1855
Catalebeda strandi Aurivillius, 1927
Catalebeda tamsi Hering, 1932
Catalebeda violascens

External links

Lasiocampidae